William Pollock McLaren  (16 October 1923 – 19 January 2010) was a Scottish rugby union commentator, teacher, journalist and one time rugby player. Known as 'the voice of rugby', he retired from commentating in 2002. Renowned throughout the sport, his enthusiasm and memorable turn of phrase endeared him to many.

Early life
McLaren was born in Hawick, in the Scottish Borders, in 1923 to a knitwear salesman from Loch Lomond-side who had moved down to the area.

As a young boy, he was steeped in local rugby stories: 

In his teenage years, McLaren grew up to be a useful flank forward. He would later play for Hawick RFC.

He served with the Royal Artillery in Italy during the Second World War, including the Battle of Monte Cassino. He was used as a forward spotter, and on one occasion was confronted by a mound of 1,500 corpses in an Italian churchyard, an unpleasant experience which never left him.

He played in a Scotland trial in 1947 and was on the verge of a full international cap before contracting tuberculosis. The disease nearly killed him and forced him to give up playing. He spent 19 months in a sanatorium in East Fortune in East Lothian, where he was given the experimental antibiotic streptomycin, which saved his life; of the five patients given the drug, only two survived. While in the hospital, he began his broadcasting career, by commenting on table tennis games on the hospital radio.

Career
McLaren studied Physical Education in Aberdeen, and went on to teach PE in different schools throughout Scotland right through to 1987. He coached several Hawick youngsters who went on to play for Scotland, including Jim Renwick, Colin Deans and Tony Stanger.

McLaren's journalistic career started as a junior reporter with the Hawick Express. In 1953, he made his national debut for BBC Radio, covering Scotland's 12–0 loss to Wales. He switched to television commentary six years later. McLaren was one of many post-war commentators who progressed from commentating on BBC Radio to BBC Television during the infancy of television broadcasting in the UK. These included Murray Walker (motor racing/Formula One), Peter O'Sullevan (horse racing), Harry Carpenter (boxing and rowing), Dan Maskell (tennis), David Coleman (athletics), Peter Alliss (golf) and John Arlott (cricket).

Recognition of his services came in November 2001, when he became the first non-international to be inducted into the International Rugby Hall of Fame. He was awarded an MBE in 1992, an OBE in 1995 and a CBE in the 2003 honours list. A Facebook group, backed by over 6,000 members, was campaigning to gain a knighthood for McLaren.

McLaren also featured as a commentator on the video games Jonah Lomu Rugby and EA Rugby 2001, and also did voice work for Telewest Communications.

During his final commentary, Wales v Scotland in 2002, the crowd sang "For He's a Jolly Good Fellow" and one Welsh supporter displayed a banner claiming "Bill McLaren is Welsh".

After retirement, McLaren wrote the book Rugby's Great Heroes and Entertainers in 2003.

In later life, McLaren contracted Alzheimer's; he had been renowned for his excellent memory.

Family
McLaren was married to Bette, with whom he had two daughters Linda (born 1952) and Janie (born 1954, died 2000). He has two famous sons-in-law, Linda married former  rugby scrum half Alan Lawson and Janie married horse racing commentator Derek Thompson. They had 5 grandchildren, three through Linda: Scotland scrum-half and Gloucester player Rory, Morphsuits co-founder and former Scotland 7s player Gregor and a daughter Lindsay. Then two through Janie: former Edinburgh and Scotland 7s player Jim Thompson and other son Alex.

Death
McLaren died on 19 January 2010 at the age of 86 in his home town of Hawick. His funeral took place on 25 January at Teviot Church in Hawick, followed by a private burial at the town's Wellogate Cemetery after his hearse was applauded through the town of Hawick by hundreds of well-wishers who lined the streets to pay their respects to the "Voice of Rugby".

On 11 March 2010, thousands of people attended a memorial celebration of Bill McLaren's life held at Murrayfield Stadium in the week leading up to that year's Calcutta Cup match which was played at the stadium. The event combined show reels of some of McLaren's most famous moments and some of McLaren's favourite music including a specially recorded performance of Caledonia by Dougie MacLean and a performance by Ronnie Browne of The Corries.  Many notable names from rugby and broadcasting attended the event with several sharing their own memories of Bill as a commentator, teacher, friend and family member.  Among those to speak were McLaren's grandson Rory Lawson who competed for Scotland in the Calcutta Cup two days later.

McLaren has continued to be honoured for his legacy in Hawick and in the sport of rugby.  A statue was unveiled in Wilton Park in Hawick in February 2013 followed in November that year by a bust of McLaren in the main reception area of Murrayfield Stadium. McLaren was named among the inaugural members of the Scottish Rugby Hall of Fame in 2010 and inducted into the World Rugby Hall of Fame during Rugby World Cup 2015.

Bill McLaren Foundation
The Bill McLaren Foundation, a charity which exists to develop and promote rugby union and sporting opportunities, was launched at Murrayfield Stadium on 4 March 2010.

See also
Scottish rugby commentators and journalists
Scotland national rugby union team

References

 Bath, Richard (ed.) The Scotland Rugby Miscellany (2007, Vision Sports Publishing Ltd)
 Miles Harrison, Miles & McLaren, Bill Grand Slam: A History of the Five Nations (1999, Aurum Press Ltd)
 McLaren, Bill Bill McLaren's Dream Lions (1998, HarperCollinsWillow )
 McLaren, Bill My Autobiography: The Voice of Rugby (2005, Bantam Books )
 McLaren, Bill Rugby's Great Heroes and Entertainers (2003, Hodder & Stoughton)
 McLaren, Bill Talking of Rugby (1991, Stanley Paul, London )
 Massie, Allan A Portrait of Scottish Rugby (Polygon, Edinburgh)

External links
A reluctant legend – Nigel Starmer-Smith pays tribute to his colleague
Bill McLaren: Legendary 'Voice of Rugby' was a family man above all (The Scotsman)
Obituary – The Guardian
Obituary – The Times
Obituary – The Telegraph
Profile on Scrum dot com
Bill McLaren Foundation – The Bill McLaren Foundation

1923 births
2010 deaths
Aberdeenshire RFC players
BBC sports presenters and reporters
British Army personnel of World War II
Commanders of the Order of the British Empire
Hawick RFC players
Royal Artillery soldiers
Rugby union journalists
Rugby union players from Hawick
Scottish rugby union commentators
Scottish rugby union players
World Rugby Hall of Fame inductees